The WDF Americas Cup is a darts tournament held biennially since 2002. The tournament consists of a singles championship. All events have a men's and women's competitions.  In 2010-2014 a youth tournament was played. Since 2016 there is individual competitions for boys and girls.

Men's medalists

Women's medalists

Youth's medalists

Boys' medalists

Girls' medalists

References

External links
 WDF Official Website

2002 establishments in North America
2002 establishments in South America
Darts tournaments